Claude Ulysse Lefebvre (February 23, 1929 – January 19, 2016) was a Canadian municipal politician, who served as mayor of the city of Laval, Quebec, Canada from 1981 to 1989.

In 1984, while Lefebvre was mayor, Laval and the French commune of Laval en Mayenne became twinned sister cities.

References

External links 

1929 births
2016 deaths
French Quebecers
Mayors of Laval, Quebec